The Euphorbioideae are a  subfamily within the family Euphorbiaceae.

See also
 Taxonomy of the Euphorbiaceae

References

 
Rosid subfamilies